Parliamentary elections were held in Bolivia in May 1925 to elect half the seats of the Chamber Deputies and one-third of the Senate.

Results

Elected members
The new senators were:
Román Paz, PR (Chuquisaca)
Damián Z. Rejas, PR (Cochabamba)
Emilio Benavides, PR (Potosí)
Ramón Rivero, PR (Oruro)
Francisco Iraizós, PR (La Paz)
Antonio L. Velasco, PR (Béni)

References

Elections in Bolivia
Bolivia
Legislative election
Election and referendum articles with incomplete results